John Sanford (June 3, 1803 – October 4, 1857) was an American businessman and politician who served one term as a U.S. Representative from New York from 1841 to 1843.

Biography

Early life
John Sanford was born in Roxbury, Connecticut. He was the second son of Sarah Curtis (1771–1856) and her husband Stephen Sandford I (1769–1848). His brother was Nehemiah Curtis Sanford, who was the father of Henry Shelton Sanford, the diplomat who founded the city of Sanford, Florida.

Career
He moved to Amsterdam, New York, in 1821 where he taught school. He later taught in Mayfield and also engaged in mercantile pursuits there. He was elected as a Democrat to the Twenty-seventh Congress (March 4, 1841 – March 3, 1843). He returned to Amsterdam and founded a carpet mill but the factory was destroyed by fire in 1854, whereupon he retired from active business.

Personal life
In 1822, he married Amsterdam native Mary Slack (1803–1888). They had three daughters and three sons: 
Sarah Caroline (1824–1871)
Stephen (1826–1913)
Nelson (1828–1848)
David (1830–1885)
Aledah (born 1833)
Harriette (born 1836)

Death 
He died in Amsterdam in 1857 and was interred there in the Green Hill Cemetery.

Family 
His son Stephen served in Congress and operated the family carpet business, as did his grandson John Sanford II. Originally Sanford Carpet, the company merged with another manufacturer to become Bigelow-Sanford. Bigelow-Sanford later became part of Mohawk Industries, a maker of carpet and other flooring.

Sources

References
 Schenectady Digital History Archive — a service of the Schenectady County Public Library

1803 births
1857 deaths
19th-century American businesspeople
John
Democratic Party members of the United States House of Representatives from New York (state)
19th-century American politicians